James Cook (born 18 August 1952) is an Australian sailor. He competed in the Flying Dutchman event at the 1984 Summer Olympics.

References

External links
 
 
 

1952 births
Living people
Australian male sailors (sport)
Olympic sailors of Australia
Sailors at the 1984 Summer Olympics – Flying Dutchman
Place of birth missing (living people)